Josephine Armstead (born October 8, 1944), also known as "Joshie" Jo Armstead, is an American soul singer and songwriter. Armstead began her career singing backing vocals for blues musician Bobby "Blue" Bland before becoming an Ikette in the Ike & Tina Turner Revue in the early 1960s. She also had some success as a solo singer, her biggest hit being "A Stone Good Lover" in 1968. As a songwriter, Armstead teamed up with Ashford & Simpson. The trio wrote hits for various artists, including Ray Charles, Aretha Franklin, Tina Britt, Ronnie Milsap, and Syl Johnson. In the 1970s, Armstead appeared in the Broadway musicals Don't Play Us Cheap and Seesaw.

Life and career
Armstead was born to Wilton and Rosie Armstead in Yazoo City, Mississippi on October 8, 1944. She started singing in the church in which her mother was a minister. After her grandfather introduced her to blues music, she also began singing in juke joints and at dances, and first sang in a club as part of Bobby "Blue" Bland's band. She joined a local band, Little Melvin & The Downbeats, as a teenager.

In 1960, Armstead along with Eloise Hester and Delores Johnson became The Ikettes as part of the Ike & Tina Turner Revue. She had been recommended to Ike Turner by her sister Velma Dishman who was his ex-wife. As an Ikette, Armstead recorded the single "I'm Blue (The Gong-Gong Song)" which peaked at No. 19 on the Billboard Hot 100 and No. 3 on the R&B chart. In 1962, Armstead settled in New York City and recorded under the name Dina Johnson, by her own account a pseudonym to avoid being tracked down by Turner. However, she recalled her time as an Ikette fondly: "It was the greatest but you had to be young to travel the Chitlin' Circuit as they called it. We weren’t flying and we didn’t stay in 5-star hotels. It was really rough. You really had to be young but it was fun and we joked and laughed a lot." She added, "I have the utmost respect for Ike Turner as an artist and what he created."

After her tenure as an Ikette, Armstead recorded advertising jingles and sang back-up for such musicians as James Brown, Walter Jackson and B.B. King, before a chance meeting with Nick Ashford and Valerie Simpson. They began writing songs together, one of the first results being "Let's Go Get Stoned", which became an R&B chart no. 1 hit for Ray Charles in 1966. Its follow-up "I Don't Need No Doctor" was also a hit. The trio of writers also had success with songs for Chuck Jackson, Maxine Brown and Tina Britt. Armstead also wrote or co-wrote hits for other artists, including "Cry Like a Baby" by Aretha Franklin, "Casonova" by Ruby Andrews, "Jealous Kind of Fella" by Garland Green, "Come On Sock It to Me" by Syl Johnson, and "Drop By My Place" by Carl Carlton.

After Ashford and Simpson joined Motown, Armstead moved to Chicago in 1967 with her husband, record producer Mel Collins, and formed Giant Productions. The Giant label released her single "I Feel An Urge Coming On" which, although not successful at the time, later became a favorite with Northern soul audiences in the UK. Two of her follow-up records, "A Stone Good Lover" and "I've Been Turned On", both made the R&B chart in 1968.

Armstead returned to New York after her marriage deteriorated and continued as a singer and writer of commercials. She was a backing vocalist on Bob Dylan's 1971 single "George Jackson", and sang backing vocals on Roberta Flack's album Quiet Fire (1971). Armstead had a role in Melvin Van Peebles' musical film, Don't Play Us Cheap, and it's stage play adaptation on Broadway. In the early 1970s, she signed to the Gospel Truth label, an offshoot of Stax, and recorded several singles as Joshie Jo Armstead, of which the most successful was "Stumblin' Blocks, Steppin' Stones" in 1974. She also sang as a backing singer for Stax. After Stax Records collapsed, Armstead continued to write songs through her own publishing company, and also worked as a fashion designer. She provided vocals for four titles on the 1977 Burt Bacharach LP Futures. In the 1980s, after returning to Chicago, Armstead had a spell managing a boxer, Alfonso Ratliff. She recorded for her own Prairie Rose Records in the 1990s.

Armstead was a 2006 STAR (Special Thanks And Recognition) honoree, awarded by the Metro New York Chapter of the Jackson State University Alumni Association.

A version of Armstead's song "I Feel An Urge Coming On," performed by Nick Waterhouse, has been used in the television soundtracks of CW shows Riverdale and Black Lightning.

Selected discography

Singles

Backing vocal credits 

 1971: Esther Phillips – From A Whisper To A Scream
 1971: Valerie Simpson – Exposed
 1971: Roberta Flack – "To Love Somebody"
 1971: Quincy Jones – Smackwater Jack
 1971: B.B. King – In London
 1972: Valerie Simpson – Valerie Simpson
 1972: David Bromberg – "Sharon"
 1972: Archie Shepp – Attica Blues
 1973: Ashford & Simpson – Gimme Something Real
 1973: Blood, Sweat & Tears – No Sweat
 1973: Esther Phillips – Black-Eyed Blues
 1974: The Kiki Dee Band – "I've Got The Music In Me"
 1974: Ashford & Simpson – I Wanna Be Selfish
 1975: Roberta Flack – Feel Like Makin' Love
 1975: Sky King – Secret Sauce
 1975: Randall Bramblett – That Other Mile
 1975: Frankie Valli – Closeup 
 1976: Ashford & Simpson – Come As You Are
 1977: Burt Bacharach – Futures
 1978: Taj Mahal – "Why You Do Me This Way"
 1978: Good Rats – "You're Still Doing It"
 1978: Sylvia Syms – She Loves To Hear The Music
 1978: Nina Simone – Baltimore
 1979: Ashford & Simpson – "Dance Forever"
 1980: Jess Roden – Stonechaser
 1981: Max Romeo – "Holding Out My Love To You"
 1982: Stephanie Mills – Tantalizingly Hot
 1998: Luther Vandross – "Get It Right"

Songwriting credits 

 1965: "The Real Thing" – Tina Britt
 1965: "One Step at a Time" – Maxine Brown
 1966: "Let's Go Get Stoned" – Ray Charles
 1965: "Hey Ho, What You Do to Me" – The Guess Who
 1965: "My Heart Belongs to You" – The Shirelles
 1965: "Never Had It so Good" – Ronnie Milsap
 1966: "The Hard Way" – The Nashville Teens
 1966: "I'm Satisfied" – Chuck Jackson & Maxine Brown
 1966: "Cry Like a Baby" – Aretha Franklin
 1966: "I Don't Need No Doctor" – Ray Charles
 1967: "Come On Sock It to Me" – Syl Johnson
 1967: "Casanova (Your Playing Days Are Over)" – Ruby Andrews
 1968: "A Stone Good Lover" – Jo Armstead 
 1968: "I've Been Turned On" – Jo Armstead 
 1968: "Sock It to Me (Part I)" – The Deacons
 1969: "Look at Mary Wonder (How I Got Over)" – Carl Carlton
 1969: "Jealous Kind of Fella" – Garland Green
 1969: "Don't Think That I'm a Violent Guy" – Garland Green
 1970: "Drop by My Place" – Carl Carlton
 1970: "I Can Feel It" – Carl Carlton
 1971: "I Don't Need No Doctor" – Humble Pie
 1972: "I Don't Need No Doctor" – New Riders of the Purple Sage
 1972: "Silly Wasn't I" – Valerie Simpson
 1973: "Cry Like a Baby" – Dorothy Moore
 1974: "Stumblin' Blocks, Steppin' Stones (What Took Me So Long)" – Jo Armstead 
 1980: "Casanova" – Coffee
 1982: "A Friend of Mine" – Gladys Knight & the Pips
 1987: "I Don't Need No Doctor" – W.A.S.P.
 1994: "Casanova" – Baby D
 2006: "Best Friend" – 50 Cent and Olivia

Stage

References

External links 
 Joshie Jo Armstead on IBDB
 
 

1944 births
Living people
Singer-songwriters from Mississippi
African-American women singer-songwriters
Ike & Tina Turner members
People from Yazoo City, Mississippi
Northern soul musicians
American rhythm and blues singer-songwriters
American soul singers
American musical theatre actresses